Stephanie Laing is an American filmmaker known primarily for her work on TV. She has worked on shows such as Tracey Takes On..., Tracey Ullman's Visible Panty Lines, Vice Principals, Divorce, Veep, and Eastbound & Down. She has also directed episodes of TV shows like I'm Sorry, Veep, Detroiters and Mixed-ish.

Her feature-length directorial debut, Irreplaceable You, was released worldwide by Netflix on February 16, 2018.

References

Living people
American filmmakers
Year of birth missing (living people)